Position Correction is the debut album by Australian Hip Hop band TZU, released in 2003. The album was released under the Liberation Music record label.

Track listing
 "Who?" - 3:56
 "Summer Days" - 3:53
 "Position Correction" - 3:57
 "Good Dog" - 4:23
 "Dam Busters" - 2:32
 "Wild Stylee feat. Mark Pearl" - 4:15
 "Curse of the Word" - 4:21
 "The Horse You Rode In On" - 3:35
 "Back Up!" - 3:57
 "Bold Digger" - 5:55
 "The Travel Song" - 10:32

TZU albums
2003 debut albums